The 2008 Polish Speedway season was the 2008 season of motorcycle speedway in Poland.

Individual

Polish Individual Speedway Championship

Golden Helmet

Junior Championship

Silver Helmet
 winner - Maciej Janowski

Bronze Helmet
 winner - Artur Mroczka

Pairs

Polish Pairs Speedway Championship
The 2008 Polish Pairs Speedway Championship was the 2008 edition of the Polish Pairs Speedway Championship. The final was held on 5 September at Toruń.

Team

Team Speedway Polish Championship
The 2008 Team Speedway Polish Championship was the 2008 edition of the Team Polish Championship. Unibax Toruń won the gold medal.

Ekstraliga

1.Liga

2.Liga

Play-offs 
Ekstraliga and First League
October 12: Gdańsk - Rzeszów 54:37
October 19: Rzeszów - Gdańsk 47:45
Rzeszów - Gdańsk 84:99

First League and Second League
October 12: Miskolc - Grudziądz 0:60 (wo)
October 19: Grudziądz - Miskolc 60:0 (wo)
Grudziądz - Miskolc 120:0

Amateur League

References

Poland Individual
Poland Team
Speedway
2008 in Polish speedway